Lipsothrix is a genus of crane fly in the family Limoniidae.

Distribution
Palaearctic & Oriental.

Species
L. apicifusca Alexander, 1957
L. assamica Alexander, 1938
L. babai Alexander, 1958
L. burmica Alexander, 1952
L. chettri Alexander, 1959
L. decurvata Alexander, 1966
L. ecucullata Edwards, 1938
L. errans (Walker, 1848)
L. fenderi Alexander, 1946
L. flavissima Alexander, 1952
L. fulva Alexander, 1966
L. heitfeldi Alexander, 1949
L. hynesiana Alexander, 1964
L. iranica Alexander, 1975
L. kashmirica Alexander, 1935
L. kraussiana Alexander, 1950
L. leucopeza Alexander, 1953
L. malla Alexander, 1959
L. mirabilis Alexander, 1940
L. mirifica Alexander, 1962
L. neotropica Alexander, 1940
L. nervosa Edwards, 1938
L. nigrilinea (Doane, 1900)
L. nigristigma Edwards, 1938
L. nobilis Loew, 1873
L. orthotenes Alexander, 1971
L. pluto Alexander, 1929
L. propatula Alexander, 1952
L. remota (Walker, 1848)
L. shasta Alexander, 1946
L. sylvia (Alexander, 1916)
L. taiwanica Alexander, 1928
L. tokunagai Alexander, 1933
L. yakushimae Alexander, 1930
L. yamamotoana Alexander, 1950

References

Limoniidae
Nematocera genera
Diptera of Asia
Diptera of Europe